Winnetka may refer to:

One of the following places in the United States:

 Winnetka, Los Angeles
 Winnetka, Illinois
 Winnetka Heights, Dallas, Texas

Or to the following educational experiment:
 The Winnetka Plan